Chan Hao-ching and Chan Yung-jan successfully defended their title, defeating Lu Jiajing and Wang Qiang in the final, 6–1, 6–1.

Seeds

Draw

Draw

References 
 Draw

Hong Kong Tennis Open - Doubles
Hong Kong Open (tennis)
Hong Kong Tennis Open - Doubles